Miriam del Carmen Peña Cárdenas is a Chilean astronomer and cosmochemist whose research includes the chemical composition of interstellar clouds including H II regions and the planetary nebulae surrounding Wolf–Rayet stars. She is a professor and researcher at the National Autonomous University of Mexico (UNAM), in the UNAM Institute of Astronomy.

Education
Peña began her university studies in Chile, studying engineering, but moved to the National Autonomous University of Mexico to complete her bachelor's degree, and remained there for her graduate studies.

Recognition
Peña is a member of the Mexican Academy of Sciences. She was a 2007 winner of UNAM's Sor Juana Inés de la Cruz Recognition.

References

External links

Year of birth missing (living people)
Living people
Chilean astronomers
Women astronomers
Astrochemists
National Autonomous University of Mexico alumni
Academic staff of the National Autonomous University of Mexico
Members of the Mexican Academy of Sciences